Iakob Nikoladze (1876 – March 10, 1951) was a Georgian sculptor and artist.  

He was from the a Georgian noble (aznauri) family, Nikoladze.  

The Georgian National Museum, Iakob Nikoladze House Museum is dedicated to his works and was established after his death in his home-studio in his native town of Kutaisi. The museum houses sculptures, sketches, photo and documentary materials. He also designed the national symbols of the Democratic Republic of Georgia.

References
Georgian museums

Sculptors from Georgia (country)
1876 births
1951 deaths
Burials at Mtatsminda Pantheon
Soviet sculptors
Academic staff of the Tbilisi State Academy of Arts
Flag designers
20th-century artists from Georgia (country)
Stroganov Moscow State Academy of Arts and Industry alumni